Sinocyclocheilus hugeibarbus is a species of ray-finned fish in the genus Sinocyclocheilus.

References

hugeibarbus
Fish described in 2003